Venice Branch is a former branch library of the Los Angeles Public Library located in the Venice section of Los Angeles, California.  The old Venice Branch library was replaced in 1995 by a new branch now known as the Venice-Abott Kinney Memorial Branch.  The Spanish Colonial Revival style building is now used as the Vera Davis McClendon Youth and Family Center.

The Venice Branch was designated as a Los Angeles Historic-Cultural Monument by the Los Angeles Cultural Heritage Commission in June 1984.  In 1987, the Venice Branch and several other branch libraries in Los Angeles were added to the National Register of Historic Places as part of a thematic group submission.   The application noted that the branch libraries had been constructed in a variety of period revival styles to house the initial branch library system of the City of Los Angeles.  With respect to the Venice Branch, the application described the building as a building in the Spanish Colonial Revival style made of masonry construction.  The front entry has oak double doors with diamond-shaped panes.  Small wrought-iron lamps flank the entrance.

See also
List of Registered Historic Places in Los Angeles
Los Angeles Public Library

References

External links
 Grand opening celebration for the new Venice-Abbot Kinney Memorial Branch Library, Aug. 12, 1995
 History of Venice and West Los Angeles branch libraries, Mar. 17, 1949

Library buildings completed in 1930
Los Angeles Historic-Cultural Monuments
Libraries on the National Register of Historic Places in Los Angeles
Buildings and structures in Los Angeles
Spanish Colonial Revival architecture in California
Libraries in Los Angeles
Venice, Los Angeles